The 1998 Rhein Fire season was the fourth season for the franchise in the NFL Europe League (NFLEL). The team was led by head coach Galen Hall in his fourth year, and played its home games at Rheinstadion in Düsseldorf, Germany. They finished the regular season in second place with a record of seven wins and three losses. Rhein won the first championship in team history by defeating the Frankfurt Galaxy 34–10 in World Bowl '98.

Personnel

Staff

Roster

Schedule

Standings

Game summaries

Week 1: vs Amsterdam Admirals

Week 2: at England Monarchs

Week 3: at Scottish Claymores

Week 5: at Frankfurt Galaxy

Week 7: at Barcelona Dragons

Notes

References

Rhein Fire seasons
Rhein
Rhein